William Temple (February 28, 1814 – May 28, 1863) was an American merchant and politician from Smyrna, in Kent County, Delaware. He was a member of the Whig Party, and later the Democratic Party, who served in the Delaware General Assembly, as Governor of Delaware, and as U.S. Representative from Delaware. He is the youngest governor to serve in Delaware in all of its history.

Early life and family
Temple was born in Queen Anne's County, Maryland, the son of George Temple. The Temples had lived in the area since the mid-1700s. Templeville, on the borders of Queen Anne and Caroline counties and near the Maryland-Delaware line, is most likely named for the Temple family. William had five brothers and a sister. At the age of 18 he moved to Smyrna, Delaware and began his work as a merchant there. He married Sarah Ann Ringgold, daughter of William Ringgold of Kenton, in 1838 and they had three children, Sarah Louisa, Emma Frances, and William George. Both his daughters died as infants, and his wife, Sarah, died in 1851 at 33 years of age. It is believed they lived at the northeast corner of Main and Mt. Vernon Streets and were members of St. Peter's Episcopal Church in Smyrna.

Delaware politics
Throughout the 19th century Delaware politics was characterized by a conservative downstate, agrarian and small business majority, in opposition to a Wilmington based industrialist minority. This majority was led into the Whig Party by John M. Clayton, but when that party broke up over the issue of slavery, generally moved over to a conservative Democratic Party. As the sectional issues intensified with the coming of the Civil War, this majority became impossibly conflicted between its certain loyalty to the Union and its equally certain view that decisions about property, including slaves, belonged with the states. The result was first an effort by many to find a non-existent middle ground, and then, with a much diminished majority, entry into constant and bitter conflict with the Republican minority centered in Wilmington and supported by the Federal government.

Governor of Delaware
As a successful and popular conservative businessman, Temple reflected the majority views well. Temple was elected to the State House in the fall of 1844. He became Speaker in January 1846. After the successive deaths in office of the elected governor, Thomas Stockton, and his constitutional successor, the Speaker of the State Senate, Joseph Maull, Temple surprisingly became governor himself on May 6, 1846, the third governor in two years. At 32 years of age, he was the youngest Delaware governor ever and only served the remainder of the term, until January 19, 1847. No sooner had he inherited the job than he received a call from President James K. Polk to raise troops for the Mexican–American War. Much of his short tenure was spent on this task.

Civil War
Following his time as governor, Temple was elected to the Delaware Senate and served in three sessions, from the 1849/50 session through the 1853/54 session. With the demise of the Whig Party, he was too conservative to support the agenda of Stephen A. Douglas, but too fearful of disunion to support the Republican Party or the eventual candidacy of John C. Breckinridge. In the election of 1860, Temple sought the elusive middle ground, and was one of the Delaware leaders of the short lived Constitutional Union Party. This party supported the right of each state to decide the slavery question, but argued that somehow that right could be preserved within the Union.

After the election of Abraham Lincoln and the secession of the Confederate states, Temple took a position opposing the enforced restoration of the Union, and joined the Democratic Party. After presiding over a futile "Peace Convention" in Dover in June 1861, he became the Democratic candidate for the U.S. House of Representatives in the hotly contested and controversial 1862 election. Temple's opponent was the incumbent Republican George P. Fisher, who had served as Secretary of State when Temple was governor. Now, Fisher was convinced that there were various schemes being planned to prevent a legitimate election. Accordingly, he requested that Abraham Lincoln leave the Delaware troops in the U.S. Army home until after the election, and that he send additional Federal troops to supervise the polls on election day. The Democrats were outraged and managed to narrowly elect Temple and a majority in the General Assembly, although losing the governorship. While officially a member of the U.S. House from March 4, 1863, Temple died before the December convening of the House, and consequently never actually served. He was forty-nine years old. In a subsequent special election, Republican Nathaniel B. Smithers won the seat due to a Democratic Party boycott of the election in protest of the continuing presence of Federal troops at the polling places.

Death and legacy
Temple died at Smyrna. He is buried in the St. Peter's Episcopal Church Cemetery. The grave was unmarked until 1979 when a stone was placed where he is believed to have been buried. The plaque on the stone simply reads, "William Temple 1814–1863 Legislator Elected to Congress Governor of Delaware 1846–1847". His grandson, William G. Temple, was an ordained priest in the Roman Catholic Church and was the first priest at St. Elizabeth's Parish in Wilmington. An obituary reads:

He was emphatically a man of the world, possessing those rare qualities calculated to win every man and repel none. Frank, generous, familiar and courteous, he possessed the key to unlock the hearts of men and blend their interests with his in the prosecution of the public interest. Certainly he was a very pure minded, honorable man, a man of soul and feeling, a friend of all and a great help to many in times of need. 

His house at Smyrna is a contributing property in the Smyrna Historic District.

Almanac
Elections are held the first Tuesday after November 1. Members of the General Assembly take office the first Tuesday of January. State senators have a four-year term and state representatives have a two-year term. The governor takes office the third Tuesday of January and has a four-year term. U.S. Representatives take office March 4 and have a two-year term.

See also
 List of United States Congress members who died in office (1790–1899)

Notes

References

Images
  Hall of Governors Portrait Gallery; Portrait courtesy of Historical and Cultural Affairs, Dover.

External links
 Biographical Directory of the Governors of the United States
 Biographical Directory of the United States Congress
 Delaware’s Governors
 
 The Political Graveyard
 Delaware Historical Society; website
 University of Delaware; Library website

1814 births
1863 deaths
18th-century American Episcopalians
People from Smyrna, Delaware
People of Delaware in the American Civil War
Businesspeople from Delaware
Delaware Whigs
Democratic Party members of the Delaware House of Representatives
Democratic Party Delaware state senators
Democratic Party governors of Delaware
Burials in Kent County, Delaware
Whig Party state governors of the United States
Democratic Party members of the United States House of Representatives from Delaware
19th-century American politicians
People from Queen Anne's County, Maryland
19th-century American businesspeople
19th-century American Episcopalians